FFHS may refer to:
 Federation of Family History Societies, a British charity
 Fergus Falls Senior High School, in Fergus Falls, Minnesota, United States
 First Flight High School, in Kill Devil Hills, North Carolina, United States

See also 
 FFH (disambiguation)